Ekaterina Mityaeva (nee Filippova) (born February 15, 1989) is a Russian athlete specializing in trail running, skyrunning, mountain running and ultra running. She is a winner and prize-winner of the international competitions and Championships of Russia.

She became bronze medalist of Marathon du Mont Blanc 2016 and 2017, Ultra Pirineu 110 km in 2017, Transgrancanaria 127 km in 2018 and won Ultra Pirineu 110 km in 2018 and High Trail Vanoise 20 km in 2019.

Ekaterina came 4th at Ultra-Trail du Mont-Blanc (UTMB) 170 km in 2019 showing the best result in history among athletes from Russia - 25:53:26.

She also holds Master of Sports of Russia in five different endurance disciplines – athletics,  skyrunning, ski mountaineering, orienteering and radio orienteering (ARDF).

Biography 
Ekaterina was born on February 15, 1989 in the city of Pokhvistnevo (Samara region). In 2013 she graduated from the Kuban State University of Physical Culture, Sports and Tourism with a degree in physical culture and sport.

Ekaterina started running at school at the age of 10 participating in school competitions. At 14 (2003) she decided to try orienteering, and in 2006 she started radio orienteering (ARDF). After 2 years she took part in the 14th ARDF World Championships in Seoul, where she took gold, silver and bronze medals in different categories. Ekaterina had also been doing athletics to get faster for orienteering.

In 2010 at an orienteering competition Ekaterina met Dmitry Mityaev. The pair became inseparable, training, competing and winning together. In 2011 Ekaterina and Dmitry decided to give road running a shot and started training for the 2012 Moscow International Marathon. The result was 02:43:49.

Ekaterina's first trail start was Konzhak Marathon in the Ural Mountains in 2013 where she came 2nd, since then she has been engaged in trail running and skyrunning.

In 2014, with the support of adidas Terrex, Ekaterina and Dmitry created their online Trail Running School, where Ekaterina trains girls, and Dmitry trains men.  The couple also organizes training camps, where they teach the technique of running and walking in the mountains.

More Results

Skyrunning

2014
 10th, Skyrunning World Championships, Vertical Kilometer, France
 10th, Skyrunning World Championships, SkyMarathon, France

2015
 11th, Skyrunning European Championships, SkyMarathon, Zegama
 7th, 2015 Skyrunner World Series, SkyRace
 4th, Skyrunning World Championships, Vertical Kilometer, France
 9th, Dolomites SkyRace 22 km, Italy
 6th, Lantau 2 Peaks Skyrunning 23 km, China
 8th, Limone Extreme 24 km, Italy
 1st, National Skyrunning Championship, Konzhak Skymarathon 30 km, Russia
 2nd, National Skyrunning Championship 20 km, Russia

2016
 1st, High Trail Vanoise 18 km, France
 5th, Skyrunning World Championships, Vertical Kilometer, France
 10th, 2016 Skyrunner World Series, Ultra
 7th, Dolomites SkyRace 22 km, Italy
 7th, SkyRace Comapedrosa 22 km, Spain
 4th, Ultra Pirineu 109 km, Spain
 8th, Buff Epic Trail Aiguestortes 40 km, Spain
 1st, Sugar Marathon 2016. National Skyrunning Championship 40 km, Russia

2017
 1st, High Trail Vanoise 20 km, France
 1st, Santana Vertikal Kilometer, Portugal
 9th, 2017 Skyrunner World Series, SkyExtreme
 4th, 2017 Skyrunner World Series, Ultra
 7th, Transvulcania Ultramarathon La Palma Island 73 km, Spain

2018
 4th, 2018 Skyrunner World Series, SkyExtra
 5th, Ultra SkyMarathon Madeira 55 km, Portugal
 9th, Trofeo Kima 50 km, Italy
 5th, Transvulcania Ultramarathon La Palma Island 73 km, Spain

2019
 1st, Odlo High Trail Vanoise, Les Balcons, 20 km, France
 4th, Transvulcania Ultramarathon La Palma Island 74 km, Spain

Trail Running

2014
 11th, Marathon du Mont Blanc, 41 km, France

2015
 1st, Elbrus World Race Trail, 34 km, Russia

2016
 1st, Elbrus World Race Trail 34 km, Russia

2017
 1st, Samoëns Trail Tour 18 km, France
 1st, Elbrus World Race Marathon 46 km, Russia

2018
 1st, Alanya Ultra, Taurus Mountain Marathon 45 km, Turkey

2019
 4th, Ultra-Trail du Mont-Blanc (UTMB) 170 km, France
 1st, Alpindustria Elbrus Race Marathon 46 km, Russia
 5th, Vibram Hong Kong 104 km, China

2020
 1st, Hoka Wild Trail 80 km, Russia

Marathon

2012
 9th, Moscow International Marathon, National Championship, Russia

2013
 1st, Volgograd International Marathon, Russia

Mountain Running

2014
 27th, European Mountain Running Championships
 22nd, World Mountain Running Championships, Italy

2015
 28th, World Mountain Running Championships, Great Britain
 2nd, Russian Cup and Open Championship of Sochi, 5860 m, Russia
 4th, XIV Championship of Russia in mountain running, 5 km, Russia
 1st, Cup of Russia, 4650 m, Russia
 4th, XII Russian Championship and I CIS Championship, 6900 m, Russia
 2nd, XIII Russian Championship and I CIS Championship, 5 km, Russia
 4th, VII Russian Long-Distance Mountain Running Championship, 30 km, Russia
 2nd, Russian Cup, Stage 16 of the Russian Grand Prix, 5700 m, Russia

References

External links
Ekaterina Mityaeva
 
 Ekaterina Mityaeva’s profile at DUV
 Ekaterina Mityaeva’s profile at ITRA

1989 births
Living people
Russian mountain runners
Russian ultramarathon runners
Russian female long-distance runners
Female ultramarathon runners
Russian sky runners
20th-century Russian women
21st-century Russian women